Cryptosporella umbrina is a plant pathogen.

References

External links 
 Index Fungorum
 USDA ARS Fungal Database

Fungal plant pathogens and diseases
Gnomoniaceae
Fungi described in 1918